Tondano (also known as Tolou, Tolour, Tondanou, and Toulour) is an Austronesian language spoken in the Tondano area of northeast Sulawesi, Indonesia. It is most similar to Tombulu and to Tonsea.

Dialects
There are three main dialects of the Tondano language: Tondano proper, Kakas or Ka'kas, and Remboken.

See also 
 Minahasan languages
 Languages of Indonesia

References

Bibliography

Further reading 

 Brickell, Timothy C., and Stefan Schnell (2017). "Do grammatical relations reflect information status? Reassessing preferred argument structure theory against discourse data from Tondano". In: Linguistic Typology 21: 177–208. DOI: 10.1515/lingty-2017-0005
 Brickell, Timothy C. (2018). "Reduplication in Tondano and Tonsawang". In: NUSA: Linguistic studies of languages in and around Indonesia 65: 81–107.
 Warouw, Maya Pinkan. "Leksikon Bahasa Daerah Tondano" In: Jurnal Duta Bahasa Vol 1, No 1 (2022): 1-8.
 WATUSEKE, F.S. (1972) "Kolano' in the Tondano Language". In: Papers in Borneo and Western Austronesian Linguistics, no. 2. Pacific Linguistics A-33: 123-129.
 WATUSEKE, F.S. “TONDANO AND NOT TOULOUR”. In: Bijdragen Tot de Taal-, Land- En Volkenkunde 143, no. 4 (1987): 552–54. http://www.jstor.org/stable/27863875.

External links 
 Hertz, Regina & Lee, Sandra (2017). Assessment of the vitality of the Tondano Language (Sulawesi, Indonesia). SIL electronic survey report

Languages of Sulawesi
Minahasan languages